Dolba is a monotypic moth genus in the family Sphingidae erected by Francis Walker in 1856. Its only species, Dolba hyloeus, the pawpaw sphinx, was first described by Dru Drury in 1773.

Distribution 
The pawpaw sphinx ranges throughout the eastern United States and southeastern Canada, south to Florida and west to Wisconsin, eastern Oklahoma, and southern Texas.

Description 
While the pawpaw sphinx's cryptic coloration appears similar to that of certain Noctuid moths, such as the members of genus Catocala, the pawpaw sphinx's forewings do not overlap at rest, such that part of the abdomen remains exposed. The pawpaw sphinx can be distinguished from the rustic sphinx (Manduca rustica) by the former's smaller size and the absence of orange dots on the abdomen that the rustic sphinx exposes in flight.

Biology 
Larvae of this species feed on pawpaw, as well as blueberries and deciduous hollies such as inkberry and winterberry.

References

External links

Sphingini
Moths described in 1773
Moths of North America
Taxa named by Dru Drury
Monotypic moth genera